Mong-yu (N23°58'23" E97°59'00"), Burma, was at the junction of the World War II-famed Ledo Road and the Burma Road. It is located about 10 miles (17 kilometers) southwest of Wanting (N24°05 E98°04) in southwestern China, where the Burma Road crossed the Burma-China border.

References

Geography of Shan State
Populated places in Shan State